Honestiores and humiliores are two categories of the population of Ancient Rome, of high and low status, respectively.  This included a variety of populations. Such as peasants, artisans, freed slaves, citizens, peregrini, or tenant farmers. Higher status groups such as equestrians or certain politicians would be part of the Honestiores. Humiliores would be subject to harsher legal penalties such as corporal punishment or public humiliation. While the Honestiores were exempt from such punishments. In law, the humiliores consisted of groups considered to be more humble. The humiliores were seen as lazy and dishonest. They were loathed by the honestiores. The honestiores were considered the more honorable class. They consisted of groups such as senators and the rich. The honestiores made up around 1% of the Roman population. The differences between the Honestiores and the Humiliores may have been an exclusively legal distinction. The division first appeared near the end of the 2nd century AD.

References

Bibliography

Literature 
 
 
Social class in ancient Rome
Ancient Rome
Ancient Rome by period
Roman law